Leo van de Ketterij (14 November 1950 – 5 July 2021) was a Dutch guitarist mostly known for his work in Shocking Blue in the early 1970s.

References 

1950 births
2021 deaths
Dutch guitarists
20th-century Dutch musicians
20th-century Dutch male musicians
20th-century guitarists
21st-century Dutch musicians
21st-century male musicians
21st-century guitarists
People from Vlissingen